Rubyrock Lake Provincial Park is a provincial park in British Columbia, Canada. More information on the park can be found on the BC Parks website.

External links

Provincial parks of British Columbia
Regional District of Bulkley-Nechako
2001 establishments in British Columbia
Protected areas established in 2001